Reuven Shefer (June 7, 1925 – March 22, 2011) was an Israeli theater and film actor.

Biography
Shefer was born in Tel Aviv. In 1957 Shefer joined the band "The Theatre Club Quartet" (רביעיית מועדון התיאטרון). Shefer played through two decades in the Giora Godik Theater and the Haifa Theatre and in 1973 he joined the Cameri Theater. During his career Shefer played varied prominent roles in theater.

Through his career Shefer also acted in films including: Sallah Shabati (1964), Moishe Ventalator (1966), Ervinka (1967), Blaumilch Canal (1969), Azit the parachuting dog (1972), Salomonico (1974) and Charlie and a half (1974).

Shefer also dubbed cartoon series, such as Maya the Honey Bee (as Philip the top-hatted grasshopper), the TV series Pippi Longstocking, and Alice in Wonderland (as the Mad Hatter).

Death
Shefer died on 22 March 2011 at his home in Tel Aviv at the age of 85. He was buried at Yarkon Cemetery.

Filmography

See also
Culture of Israel
Cinema of Israel

References

External links
 

1925 births
2011 deaths
Israeli male film actors
Israeli male stage actors
Israeli male voice actors
Male actors from Tel Aviv
Burials at Yarkon Cemetery